Shivah (also Romanized as Shīvah and Shīveh; also known as Shivekh) is a village in Golabar Rural District, in the Central District of Ijrud County, Zanjan Province, Iran. At the 2006 census, its population was 1,388, in 324 families.

References 

Populated places in Ijrud County